= Male member =

Male member may refer to:

- A member of a group or organization who is male
- A euphemism for penis
